The Tomorrow Man is a 2019 American drama film written and directed by Noble Jones, in his directorial debut. It stars John Lithgow, Blythe Danner, Derek Cecil, Katie Aselton, Sophie Thatcher, and Eve Harlow. It had its world premiere at the Sundance Film Festival on January 30, 2019, and was released in the United States on May 22, 2019, by Bleecker Street.

Plot
While preparing for the apocalypse, a man meets and falls in love with a woman at the grocery store.

Cast
 John Lithgow as Ed Hemsler
 Blythe Danner as Ronnie Meisner
 Derek Cecil as Brian
 Katie Aselton as Janet
 Sophie Thatcher as Jeanine
 Eve Harlow as Tina
 Wendy Makkena as Beverly St. Michaels

Production
The film shot around Rochester, New York, Lithgow's hometown, for about six weeks in August and September 2017.

Release
The film had its world premiere at the Sundance Film Festival on January 30, 2019. Prior to this, Bleecker Street acquired distribution rights to the film and set it for a May 22, 2019 release. Sony Pictures Worldwide Acquisitions acquired international distribution rights to the film.

Reception 
The site's critical consensus reads, "John Lithgow and Blythe Danner are almost enough to save The Tomorrow Man, but their efforts are overwhelmed by a problematic story." On Metacritic, the film has a weighted average score of 49 out of 100, based on 18 critics, indicating "mixed or average reviews".

References

External links
 
 

2019 films
2019 drama films
American drama films
Bleecker Street films
Films produced by James Schamus
Films scored by Paul Leonard-Morgan
Films set in New York (state)
Films shot in New York (state)
2019 directorial debut films
2010s English-language films
2010s American films